Lipowa Góra may refer to:

Lipowa Góra, Podlaskie Voivodeship (north-east Poland)
Lipowa Góra, Kętrzyn County in Warmian-Masurian Voivodeship (north Poland)
Lipowa Góra, Ostróda County in Warmian-Masurian Voivodeship (north Poland)